Mirza Ahsan Jamil Baig (born 6 October 1992) is a Pakistani cricketer who has played for several teams in Pakistani domestic cricket. He is a slow left-arm wrist-spin bowler.

Ahsan made his first-class cricket at the age of 15, playing for Pakistan Customs in the 2007–08 season of the Quaid-i-Azam Trophy. Later in the season, he also appeared for the Karachi Zebras in the ABN-AMRO Cup, a limited-overs competition. Ahsan was subsequently selected in the Pakistani under-19s squad for the 2008 Under-19 World Cup (as its youngest member), although he did not play a game at the tournament. Two years later, he represented the Pakistan under-21s in the cricket tournament at the 2010 South Asian Games in Bangladesh, winning a bronze medal. In May 2015, Ahsan returned to the highest level of Pakistani domestic cricket for the first time since 2008, playing a single match for the Karachi Dolphins in the 2015 Haier Super 8 T20 Cup. For the 2015–16 season, he joined Habib Bank Limited's one-day team.

References

External links

1992 births
Living people
Habib Bank Limited cricketers
Karachi Dolphins cricketers
Karachi Zebras cricketers
Pakistan Customs cricketers
Pakistani cricketers
Cricketers from Karachi
South Asian Games bronze medalists for Pakistan
South Asian Games medalists in cricket